David Vitoria is a Swiss former professional road cyclist. He resides in the town Albacete by Ossa de Montiel and was a training partner of fellow professional cyclist Óscar Sevilla.

He turned professional at the age of 22 with the Swiss team Phonak. Later he joined the still modest BMC Racing Team. In 2008 he raced as an amateur (with the Universidad Politécnica de Valencia Bancaja) but returned in 2009 with Rock Racing alongside Óscar Sevilla.

For the season 2010 the UCI ProTour team  signed him thus taking the leap into the professional class. He retired in 2011.

Major Results
2005
6th Giro del Mendrisiotto
7th Neuseen Classics
10th Giro del Lago Maggiore
2007
3rd Time trial, Swiss National Road Championships
8th Lancaster Classic
2009
3rd Overall Vuelta Mexico
1st Stages 4 & 5
5th Philadelphia International Championship
8th Vuelta a La Rioja
9th Kampioenschap van Vlaanderen
2010
8th Philadelphia International Championship

References

External links
 

1984 births
Living people
Spanish male cyclists
Swiss male cyclists
People from Locarno
Sportspeople from Ticino
Swiss people of Spanish descent
Sportspeople from the Province of Albacete
Cyclists from Castilla-La Mancha